Sni-A-Bar Creek is a stream in Jackson and Lafayette counties in the U.S. state of Missouri. It is a tributary of the Missouri River.

The stream turns north three miles north of Lone Jack. It continues to the north passing under Interstate 70 just east of Grain Valley. It then turns to the northeast and passes back into Lafayette County.

Sni-A-Bar is possibly a corruption of chenail Hubert, meaning "Hubert channel/slough" in French. Alternatively, the name may have come from a French frontiersman named Abar who was charting a course on the Missouri River in the early 1800s.

Alternate names include Big Sni-A-Bar Creek, Sni-A-Bar River and Sniabar Creek. Alexander Majors, one of the founders of the Pony Express, called the creek Big Snye Bear River in his book Seventy Years on the Frontier.

See also
List of rivers of Missouri

References

Rivers of Jackson County, Missouri
Rivers of Lafayette County, Missouri
Rivers of Missouri